Aafrah is a mountain of eastern Lebanon. It has an elevation of 1645 metres.

References

Mountains of Lebanon